Strange Voices is a 1987 American made-for-television drama film about schizophrenia directed by Arthur Allan Seidelman and written by Wayne and Donna Powers.  It was one of the ten highest rated made for TV movies that year with a 33 share in the Nielsen Ratings. The reviews were mixed as the film was criticized as inferior to other made-for-television movies about the disorder, including Promise (1986). The New York Times, for instance, called it "too much, too late".

Plot 
Nicole is a bright, gifted and attractive college student, with a normal home life and a boyfriend. Trouble starts when she gets paranoid that her boyfriend is cheating on her and comments that "they" told her everything. She returns home and starts to hear voices. Confused, she begins acting violently, destroying her father's computer and offending his guests during a party. Her parents Dave and Lynn take her to the hospital, where she is diagnosed with schizophrenia. They refuse to believe that she has the disorder, however, blaming Nicole's behavior on her split with Jeff. They ignore the doctor's advice and take her back home, where she admits to her younger sister Lisa that she reacted that way because she heard voices and couldn't control herself. Nicole soon returns to college, takes back Jeff and stops taking the medication she was prescribed.

Soon, Nicole starts to hear voices again and becomes delusional. She ends up stopping in the middle of a freeway, stepping out of her car and panicking. Her parents agree to take her to the hospital, but are upset to find out that there is no cure, and respond angrily when she denies treatment. Lynn tries to force Nicole to take medication, but she refuses to, explaining that it makes her feel sick. However, without the medication, she has a relapse of her psychotic symptoms. Realizing what she is doing, she gives in on the pills and allows her mother to help her. Side effects include suffering from seizures, which pushes her to make the decision to quit using medication again. She pretends that she is taking the pills, but is caught by Lisa.

Nicole is upset to find out that her parents are constantly arguing over the way she should be treated. Meanwhile, Lisa feels neglected by their parents and blames Nicole for acting the way she does only to get attention. After a few other outbursts, including destroying items with a knife and starting a small kitchen fire, Lynn sends her to a mental institution. Dave is opposed to this, feeling that he is abandoning his daughter. Nicole stills refuses to take pills, telling her psychiatrist that she would rather feel confused than to feel nothing at all. One night, she escapes from the institution and is nowhere to be found. During his search for her, Dave blames himself for what happened to her.

After two weeks without a trace of her, Nicole is arrested for having eaten at a diner without paying. She is questioned, but initially can't remember who she is. Lynn and Lisa finally pick Nicole up and take her home, but Dave refuses to talk to her and when Lynn confronts him about it, he responds that she is too sick to notice anyway. Meanwhile, Lisa is admitted to Rochester University, but she decides not to go, much to the distress of Lynn. When Lynn confronts her, Lisa admits that she is afraid that she may turn out the same way as Nicole, but Lynn assures her that that is not a possibility. In the end, Nicole tries to commit suicide by an overdose. She recovers and builds up a bond with her father again, and Lynn and Dave finally decide to work together as well to help Nicole.

Cast

References

External links

1987 television films
1987 films
1987 drama films
American drama television films
American films based on actual events
Fictional portrayals of schizophrenia
NBC network original films
Films directed by Arthur Allan Seidelman
1980s English-language films
1980s American films